Crown is an unincorporated community in Atascosa County, in the U.S. state of Texas. According to the Handbook of Texas, the community had a population of 10 in 2000. It is located within the San Antonio metropolitan area.

History
Crown started as a settlement of freed slaves and was named Lagunillas. A post office was established at Crown in 1900 and remained in operation until 1923. The community was given this name because of a sewing machine having a crown trademark on it. The first postmaster was John W Crouch. The settlement's population was 25 in 1914 and had a gin and general store in operation. Its population grew to 50 in 1925 but then declined to 15 in 1933. The boll weevil wiped out the community's cotton farms in 1937. Crown had a few scattered homes, a business, and oil wells along the edge of the Big Foot Oilfield in 1990 and had a population of 10 in 2000.

Geography

Education
Crown's local school, Lagunillas School, had 54 students enrolled in 1904. It grew to 244 students in 1914 and was renamed Crown School. The school then joined the Charlotte Independent School District in 1933. It continues to be served by Charlotte ISD to this day.

References

Unincorporated communities in Atascosa County, Texas
Unincorporated communities in Texas